Maria Alekseyevna Ouspenskaya (29 July 1876 – 3 December 1949) was a Russian actress and acting teacher. She achieved success as a stage actress as a young woman in Russia, and as an elderly woman in Hollywood films.

Life and career
Ouspenskaya was born in Tula, Tsarist Russia. She studied singing in Warsaw and acting in Moscow. She was a founding member of the First Studio, a theatre studio of the Moscow Art Theatre. There she was trained by Konstantin Stanislavsky and his assistant Leopold Sulerzhitsky.

The Moscow Art Theatre traveled widely throughout Europe, and when it arrived in New York City in 1922, Ouspenskaya decided to stay there. She performed regularly on Broadway over the next decade. She taught acting to Lee Strasberg among others, at the American Laboratory Theatre, and in 1929, together with Richard Boleslawski, her colleague from the Moscow Art Theatre, she founded the School of Dramatic Art in New York City. One of Ouspenskaya's students at the school was an unknown teenaged Anne Baxter.

Although she had appeared in a few Russian silent films many years earlier, Ouspenskaya stayed away from Hollywood until her school's financial problems forced her to look for ways to repair her finances. According to ads from Popular Song magazine in the 1930s, around this time Ouspenskaya also opened the Maria Ouspenskaya School of Dance on Vine Street in Los Angeles. Her pupils included Marge Champion, the model for Disney's Snow White.

In spite of her marked Russian accent, she did find work in Hollywood, playing European characters of various national origins. Her first Hollywood role was in Dodsworth (1936), which brought her a nomination for an Academy Award for Best Supporting Actress. (Her onscreen appearance in that film was one of the briefest ever to garner a nomination.) She received a second Oscar nomination for her role in Love Affair (1939).

She portrayed Maleva, an old Romani fortuneteller in the horror films The Wolf Man (1941) and Frankenstein Meets the Wolf Man (1943), both with Lon Chaney Jr. and Bela Lugosi. Other films in which she appeared were: The Rains Came (1939), Waterloo Bridge (1940), Beyond Tomorrow (1940), Dance, Girl, Dance (1940), Frank Borzage's The Mortal Storm (1940), Dr. Ehrlich's Magic Bullet (1940), and Kings Row (1942).

Death
Ouspenskaya died several days after suffering a stroke and receiving severe burns in a house fire, which was reportedly caused when she fell asleep while smoking a cigarette. She was buried in Glendale's Forest Lawn Memorial Park Cemetery.

Famous quotes
In the film The Wolf Man, Maleva, The Gypsy Woman (played by Maria Ouspenskaya) utters her iconic quote as the Wolf Man is dying:

"The way you walked was thorny, through no fault of your own, but as the rain enters the soil, the river enters the sea, so tears run to a predestined end. Your suffering is over. Now you will find peace for eternity."

In popular culture

In Truman Capote's novella, Breakfast at Tiffany's, Holly Golightly opines diamonds "only look right on the really old girls" and mentions Ouspenskaya.

In the episode titled "What's in a Middle Name?" of The Dick Van Dyke Show, characters Sally Rogers and Buddy Sorrell have an animated discussion of baby names as follows:
 Buddy: "I got it! I got it!"
 Sally: "What is it?"
 Buddy: "Humphrey!"
 Sally: "Get rid of it!"
 Buddy: "What's the matter with Humphrey? Bogart didn't do bad with it."
 Sally: "Well, Maria Ouspenskaya didn't do bad either, but would you name YOUR kid Maria Ouspenskaya?!"
 Buddy: "No, and for only one reason."
 Sally: "Why?"
 Buddy: "Because my brother named HIS kid that!"

In Tony Kushner's play Angels in America, Part II: Perestroika Prior Walter quips with Hannah Pitt.

 Hannah: You had a vision.
 Prior: A vision. Thank you, Maria Ouspenskaya. I'm not so far gone that I can be assuaged by pity and lies.

Bosley Crowther, criticizing the 1963 film Kings of the Sun for The New York Times, says about Richard Basehart's performance: "As the high priest of the Mayans, swathed in dirty dresses and adorned with a mountainous gray wig, he looks exactly like the late Maria Ouspenskaya."

In Scared to Death, the monster's first victim rejects a telephone invitation to a Maria Ouspenskaya film festival just before she is killed.

In The Sandlot, a brief clip of Maria Ouspenskaya in The Wolf Man is playing when the dog (The Beast) rips through the screen while chasing Benny through the theater.

Filmography

See also

List of actors with Academy Award nominations

References

External links

 
 
 

1876 births
1949 deaths
20th-century American actresses
Actresses from the Russian Empire
Actresses from Tula, Russia
American film actresses
American stage actresses
Burials at Forest Lawn Memorial Park (Glendale)
Deaths from fire in the United States
Soviet emigrants to the United States